Abdessamed Achahbar  (born in Utrecht, Netherlands on 29 October 1992) better known as Lijpe is a Dutch rapper of Moroccan origin. He is born in Maarssen. He released his EP Van de bodem naar de grond in 2014 and his debut album Levensles in 2015. His 2016 album Jackpot reached number 2 on the Dutch Albums chart. Now the first in the chart

Discography

Albums

EPs

Singles

Other charting releases

Featured in

References

Dutch rappers
Moroccan rappers
Dutch people of Moroccan descent
1993 births
Musicians from Utrecht (city)
Living people